KNYE is an American radio station located in Pahrump, Nye County, Nevada. The station plays an eclectic mix of pop music most of the broadcast day.  Coast to Coast AM is heard every night. The signals are received in Las Vegas 60 miles to the east and Death Valley 30 miles to the west.
On May 29, 2008 Art Bell, former host of Coast to Coast AM sold KNYE to station manager Karen Jackson for $600,000. In 2013, the station changed its slogan from "Where things go Pahrump in the night" to "The Big Voice of The Valley".

References

External links
KNYE 95.1 The Kingdom Of Nye - Official Site

NYE
Pahrump, Nevada